The 2016 International GT Open season was the eleventh season of the International GT Open, the grand tourer-style sports car racing founded in 2006 by the Spanish GT Sport Organización. It began on 23 April at Autódromo do Estoril and ended on 6 November, at Barcelona after seven double-header meetings.

Entry list

Notes

Race calendar

A seven-round provisional calendar was revealed on 12 November 2015. On 8 March 2016, the final round was pushed back a week.

Championship standings

Scoring system
The scored points P in the race are calculated with the following formula: P = S + C. 
Being “S” the points scored in the Scratch classification and “C” the points scored in the class.
Points per category (C) are allotted in its entirely if, at least, 6 participants start the race.
If the number of participants starting the race is less than 6, 50% of the points will be allotted.

Scratch Race points

Class Race points

Teams' Championship

References

External links
 

International GT Open
International GT Open seasons